The Fisher Boomerang is a single-seat conventional landing gear, high-winged monoplane ultralight aircraft designed by Michael Fisher and introduced in mid-1982.

Development
The Boomerang was intended to meet the requirements of the US FAR 103 Ultralight Vehicles category, including that category's maximum  empty weight.

The aircraft is a single-seat ultralight with a high wing and a conventional three-axis type with ailerons, elevators and rudder. The airframe structure is of 6061T6 and 2024T3 aluminum tube, covered with Stits Polyfibre aircraft fabric. The landing gear is of a fixed taildragger configuration without suspension on the  main wheels.

The Boomerang is fitted with a  Kawasaki 340 engine as standard equipment or optionally a  Kawasaki 440A engine, both with a reduction drive system.

The aircraft was discontinued due to poor sales.

Specifications (Boomerang)

See also

References

1980s United States ultralight aircraft
Aircraft first flown in 1982
High-wing aircraft
Single-engined tractor aircraft